The Hockey Rules Board, which is a board under the Executive Board of the International Hockey Federation (FIH), produces rules for both indoor and outdoor field hockey.

specifying the current rules and working with others in the game to ensure they are interpreted and applied consistently and fairly at all levels of participation; 
providing advice to umpires and other technical officials about rules matters; 
developing the rules while retaining the game’s well known and appealing characteristics; 
aiming to make the game even safer and easier to understand for players and spectators; 
conducting trials and promoting rules changes to achieve these objectives;      
contributing to the development of the game as a whole including the development of equipment and variations in the format of the game.

Membership

There are currently 16 members including a Chairman, Secretary, and Rules Development Secretary in the Board.

All of them have played and/or umpired hockey. Indeed, most of them are still very active with their current involvement in the game ranging from coaching at the top level to playing at veteran’s level. The members of the Board come from all over the world.

The overall shared experience (with some members having taken part in the game in various ways at different times) is: 8 international players, 5 coaches, 7 international umpires, 6 senior Tournament Officials and 3 international team managers.

Reasons to change the rules

The Board change the rules owing to three main reasons.

One reason is to keep up with technical advances. The development of synthetic playing surfaces, player fitness, stick manufacturing and coaching tactics has changed the game and it is important that the rules keep pace with such changes.

Another reason for change is to address safety issues. Everyone’s view of safety and liability has changed over the years. For example, thirty years ago goalkeepers did not wear helmets but today’s standards and personal expectations demand increased protection.

A third reason is to ensure that hockey continues as a popular sport throughout the world. In today’s fast paced electronic age, the public, especially young children, are attracted by sports they see on television. The Olympic movement has recognised this and are now including more attractive and exciting sports in their programmes. Whether one likes this or not, it is very clear that, if a sport is to attract young players and indeed keep its place in the Olympics, it must be an attractive game to watch and to play. Hockey has considerable room for improvement in this area and the Hockey Rules Board together with the FIH is aware of this.

Procedure to change the rules

The Board usually introduces significant rules change through extensive trial and a period of mandatory experiment. Experience suggests that monitoring the effectiveness of significant rule change(s) is best done when only one change is implemented at any one time – so it tries to operate in this way whenever possible.

Other amendments to the rules are essentially of a minor nature and will not affect the conduct of the game to any great extent and so a few are sometimes implemented at the same time.

Everyone must play by this rule until the Hockey Rules Board decides whether or not to make it an official rule. During the period of a mandatory experiment the Hockey Rules Board is therefore very keen to get feedback through National Associations.

Before a mandatory experiment is introduced, the Hockey Rules Board will first encourage National Associations to trial the proposed change voluntarily in a recognised league or other series of matches and to report the results, after the Board considers a substantial rules change. If the results are favourable the Hockey Rules Board may then introduce a mandatory experiment.

See also
History and rules evolution
Offside (field hockey)

External links
International Hockey Federation Rules

Field hockey organizations
Sports rules and regulations